Midsummer Dream is a 2005 computer-animated film from Dygra Films, the creators of The Living Forest. Made in Spain and Portugal, the film is loosely based on William Shakespeare's play A Midsummer Night's Dream.

Character
The main character is the girl Helena, a princess.

Voice cast
The voice cast of the English speaking version includes:
Romola Garai as Helena
Bernard Hill as Theseus
Billy Boyd as Puck
Rhys Ifans as Lysander
Miranda Richardson as Titania
Fiona Shaw as The Witches
Toby Stephens as Demetrius

Production
Directed by Ángel de la Cruz and Manolo Gómez, the production team totalled over 400 people over the lifetime of the project.

See also 
 List of Spanish films of 2005

Notes and references

Notes

References

Sources

Further reading

External links

2005 films
Spanish animated films
2000s Spanish-language films
2005 computer-animated films
Best Animated Film Goya Award winners
Films based on A Midsummer Night's Dream
Portuguese animated films
Portuguese fantasy films
2000s Spanish films